The Men's football tournament at 2006 South Asian Games was held across in Colombo, Sri Lanka from 14 to 26 August 2006. All matches took place at Sugathadasa Outdoor Sport Complex. India enter with their U-20 team; the other sides are U-23 teams.

Fixtures and results
Results correct as of 1 December 2013.

Times listed are UTC+05:30.

Group A

Group B

Knockout stage

Semi finals

Bronze medal match

Gold medal match

Winner

Final ranking

Notes and references

External links
 RSSSF

2006 South Asian Games
2006 South Asian Games